Patrick Carl Scully (born 4 April 1957), is a former Australian politician and minister in the New South Wales Government before his forced resignation on 25 October 2006 for deceit from misleading parliament.

Background and early career
Scully was born in Sydney and educated at state schools. He graduated in law from Macquarie University, Sydney, and was active in the Labor Party since 1976. He practised as a solicitor between 1983 and 1990.

Political career
Scully was elected to the New South Wales Legislative Assembly as member for the safe Labor seat of Smithfield at the 1990 by-election. He is a member of the dominant right-wing faction of the New South Wales Labor Party.

Scully held the ministerial portfolios of small business and regional development (1995), state development (1995), public works and services (1995–97), roads and transport (1997–2003), housing (2003–05) and police (2005–06).

Scully was considered a possible candidate to replace Bob Carr as Premier of New South Wales, and announced his intention to run for the position after Carr announced his resignation in July 2005. But he withdrew from the contest on 29 July when it became clear that health minister Morris Iemma had majority support in the Labor Caucus. Although Scully publicly blamed the party machine for working against him, it was reported that some Labor MPs feared his record as transport minister during the Waterfall train disaster and other problems would have worked against the party at the next state election if he were leader.

During Scully’s time in office, it was revealed that he misled parliament on multiple occasions and as a result was ultimately sacked by the NSW Premier for deceit. NSW minister sacked for deceit 

Scully did not recontest Smithfield at the 2007 state election; and claimed he rejected an offer from Labor to contest a federal seat. In 2013 Scully testified that he was disappointed that Eddie Obeid, a powerbroker, had orchestrated Iemma becoming premier instead of Scully himself.

In 2017, Scully released his autobiography titled Setting the Record Straight.

In response to Scully's autobiography, journalist Emma Jones wrote an article for The Australian, “Revealed: secret plan to blow up the Harbour Bridge". In this article, Jones discusses how Scully's autobiography makes mention of a secret plan from World War II, which explained how best to blow up the Sydney Harbour Bridge during an invasion from the North. Scully used the secret plan during his time in government, to assist in protecting the Sydney Harbour Bridge from terrorism after the September 11 terrorist attacks.

References

1957 births
People educated at Chatswood High School
Living people
Members of the New South Wales Legislative Assembly
Australian Labor Party members of the Parliament of New South Wales
21st-century Australian politicians